The videography of South Korean group Blackpink consists of 13 music videos.

Music videos

DVD & Blu-ray (BD)

Other releases

See also
Blackpink discography

References

External links 
Official channel on YouTube

Videography
Videographies of South Korean artists